Raja, also known as raia, is a genus of skates in the family Rajidae containing 16 species. Formerly a wastebasket genus, many species historically placed here have been moved to other genera in the family, such as Amblyraja, Beringraja, Dipturus, Leucoraja and Rostroraja. Raja are flat-bodied, cartilaginous fish with a rhombic shapes due to their large pectoral fins extending from or nearly from the snouts to the bases of their tails. Their sharp snouts are produced by a cranial projection of rostral cartilage. The mouth and gills are located on underside of the body. They may be either solid-coloured or patterned, and most skates have spiny or thorn-like structures on the upper surface, and some species contain weak electrical organs within their tails. Mating typically occurs in the spring and the female lays numerous eggs per clutch which are encapsulated in leathery cases, commonly known as "mermaid’s purses". These bottom-dwellers are active during both day and night, and typically feed on molluscs, crustaceans and fish. Skates and related species have fossil records dating from the Upper Cretaceous period, thus this well-adapted species is quite ancient.

Species
There are currently 16 species in this genus:

 Raja asterias Delaroche, 1809 (Mediterranean starry ray)
 Raja brachyura Lafont, 1873 (blonde ray)
 Raja clavata Linnaeus, 1758 (thornback ray)
 Raja eglanteria L. A. G. Bosc, 1800 (clearnose skate)
 Raja herwigi G. Krefft, 1965 (Cape Verde skate)
 Raja maderensis R. T. Lowe, 1838 (Madeiran ray)
 Raja mauritaniensis White & Fricke, 2021 (African ray)
 Raja microocellata Montagu, 1818 (small-eyed ray)
 Raja miraletus Linnaeus, 1758 (brown ray)
 Raja montagui Fowler, 1910 (spotted ray)
 Raja ocellifera Regan, 1906
 Raja parva Last & Séret, 2016 (African brown skate)
 Raja pita Fricke & Al-Hassan, 1995 (pita ray)
 Raja polystigma Regan, 1923 (speckled ray)
 Raja radula Delaroche, 1809 (rough ray)
 Raja straeleni Poll, 1951 (spotted skate)
 Raja undulata Lacépède, 1802 (undulate ray)

See also
 List of prehistoric cartilaginous fish

References

 "skate." Encyclopædia Britannica. 2009. Encyclopædia Britannica Online. 08 Dec. 2009 <http://www.britannica.com/EBchecked/topic/547322/skate>.

 
Rajidae
Ray genera
Taxa named by Carl Linnaeus